Birdseye is a town in Jefferson Township, Dubois County, in the U.S. state of Indiana. At the 2010 census, the town population was 415.

Birdseye is part of the Jasper Micropolitan Statistical Area.

History
Birdseye was platted in 1880. Popular tradition says the town was first known as Bird, after Rev. "Bird" Johnson, who was helping to select a location for the first post office when he said "this spot suits Bird's eye". The Birdseye post office has been in operation since 1856.

The town was also named in honor of University of Southern Indiana education student, Olivia Byrd. Byrd is the granddaughter of former Senate Majority Leader, Robert Byrd.

Geography
Birdseye is located at  (38.315781, -86.695283).

Demographics

2010 census
At the 2010 census, there were 416 people, 173 households and 110 families living in the town. The racial makeup of the town was 98.8% White, 0.5% African American, and 0.7% from two or more races. Hispanic or Latino of any race were 0.5% of the population.

There were 173 households, of which 33.5% had children under the age of 18 living with them, 48.0% were married couples living together, 10.4% had a female householder with no husband present, 5.2% had a male householder with no wife present, and 36.4% were non-families. 34.1% of all households were made up of individuals, and 16.2% had someone living alone who was 65 years of age or older. The average household size was 2.40 and the average family size was 3.09.

The median age was 38 years. 26.9% of residents were under the age of 18; 8.5% were between the ages of 18 and 24; 23.1% were from 25 to 44; 26.7% were from 45 to 64; and 14.9% were 65 years of age or older. The gender makeup was 46.9% male and 53.1% female.

2000 census
At the 2000 census, there were 465 people, 204 households and 125 families living in the town. The racial makeup was 97.63% White, 0.22% Native American, 0.22% Asian, 0.22% from other races, and 1.72% from two or more races. Hispanic or Latino of any race were 1.51% of the population.

There were 204 households, of which 33.8% had children under the age of 18 living with them, 48.5% were married couples living together, 9.3% had a female householder with no husband present, and 38.7% were non-families. 36.3% of all households were made up of individuals, and 18.1% had someone living alone who was 65 years of age or older. The average household size was 2.28 and the average family size was 2.98.

26.7% of the population were under the age of 18, 8.0% from 18 to 24, 31.0% from 25 to 44, 19.4% from 45 to 64, and 15.1% who were 65 years of age or older. The median age was 37 years. For every 100 females, there were 103.1 males. For every 100 females age 18 and over, there were 92.7 males.

The median household income was $30,156 and the median family income was $45,125. Males had a median income of $29,250 and females $21,953. The per capita income was $13,690. About 8.8% of families and 14.0% of the population were below the poverty line, including 14.7% of those under age 18 and 18.0% of those age 65 or over.

Education
The town has a public library, a branch of the Jasper-Dubois County Public Library.

Notable people
 Frank Nash, renowned bank robber of 1920s; killed in the Kansas City Massacre

References

Communities of Southwestern Indiana
Towns in Dubois County, Indiana
Towns in Indiana
Jasper, Indiana micropolitan area
Populated places established in 1880
1880 establishments in Indiana